Thomas A. White (12 August 1931 – 7 May 2017) was an archbishop of the Catholic Church who worked in the diplomatic service of the Holy See, serving in Africa, China, Latin America, and the Pacific region. He once described his career as "gypsy for the sake of the Kingdom".

Biography
Thomas Anthony White was born in Durrow, County Laois, Irish Free State, on 12 August 1931, one of five children. He attended Cullohill National School and then St Kieran's College, Kilkenny, where he excelled in academics and hurling. White was ordained to the priesthood on 25 February 1956 and briefly taught canon law at St. Kieran's.

To prepare for a diplomatic career he entered the Pontifical Ecclesiastical Academy in 1958. His first assignment took him to Nairobi, where the Apostolic Delegation to Eastern Africa was preparing for developing diplomatic relations with the countries of the region as they achieved their independence. He later worked in Latin America and Switzerland. His last staff assignment was in China, first on the mainland and then in the nunciature's new location in Taiwan.

On 27 May 1978, Pope Paul VI appointed him titular archbishop of Sabiona and served apostolic nuncio to Rwanda. He received his episcopal consecration on 30 July 1978 from Cardinal Agnelo Rossi

On 1 March 1983, Pope John Paul II named him Apostolic Pro-Nuncio to Ethiopia. Famine relief was the central occupation of his time there. He suffered a heart attack in 1988.

On 14 October 1989, he was appointed Apostolic Pro-Nuncio to New Zealand and Fiji as well as Apostolic Delegate to Oceania. On 1 December 1992, he received the additional title of Apostolic Nuncio to Nauru. On 31 July 1995 he was named Apostolic Nuncio to Kiribati as well.

He left the diplomatic service upon his replacement in several of his posts by Patrick Coveney on 27 April 1996.

In retirement he lived in Blackrock, a Dublin suburb, and continued to fill special assignments for the Vatican Secretariat of State. He settled finally at a nursing home in Kilkenny where he died on 7 May 2017.

References

1931 births
2017 deaths
Pontifical Ecclesiastical Academy alumni
Irish Roman Catholic archbishops
Apostolic Nuncios to Rwanda
Apostolic Nuncios to New Zealand
Apostolic Nuncios to Fiji
Apostolic Nuncios to Nauru
Apostolic Nuncios to Samoa
Apostolic Nuncios to the Pacific Ocean
Apostolic Nuncios to Ethiopia
Irish Roman Catholic titular bishops
Diplomats of the Holy See